The uninhabited Hamilton Island is located in Qikiqtaaluk Region, Nunavut, Canada. It is a member of the Arctic Archipelago and lies in the Parry Channel, north of Russell Island, and southwest of Young Island.

References

External links 
 Hamilton Island (Nunavut) in the Atlas of Canada - Toporama; Natural Resources Canada

Uninhabited islands of Qikiqtaaluk Region